Roydhouse is a hamlet in the Kirklees district, in the English county of West Yorkshire.

The hamlet's public house is the '3 Acres' on Drinker Lane.

Nearby settlements 
Nearby settlements include the town of Huddersfield, the villages of Skelmanthorpe and Shelley and the hamlet of Thorncliffe.

History 
Roydhouse was also known as "le Roides".

References 

 A-Z West Yorkshire (page 156)

Hamlets in West Yorkshire
Kirkburton